is the 17th single from Japanese pop singer Kaela Kimura.

Track listing

References

2011 singles
Kaela Kimura songs
Japanese-language songs
Songs written by Kaela Kimura
2011 songs